Prince Fiifi Cudjoe, popularly known as Fiifi Adinkra, is a Ghanaian blogger known for GhanaNdwom.net.

Career 
Adinkra is the founder of GhanaNdwom.net, an online show business hub in Ghana, and is also the CEO of Adinkra Metrix Multimedia LTD.

He has worked with Stonebwoy, Bisa Kdei, Gasmilla, Okyeame Kwame, Legendary Rechordz, and Chase.

In 2015, Adinkra was nominated for "Digital Personality Of The Year" and GhanaNdwom.net was nominated for "Best Music Platform" at the Swish HQ Ghana digital awards.

In 2017 and 2018, he was listed on GhanaTalk's Most influential Bloggers in Ghana  and was ranked 5th on Avance Media's Top 50 Ghanaian Bloggers respectively.

Awards and nominations

References 

1987 births
Living people
Ghanaian bloggers
People from Sekondi-Takoradi
Gossip columnists
Ghanaian journalists
Ghanaian publishers (people)